Hello the Boat! is a children's historical novel by Phyllis Crawford. Set in 1817, it follows the journey of a store-boat down the Ohio River from Pittsburgh to Cincinnati. The novel, illustrated by Edward Laning, was first published in 1938 and was a Newbery Honor recipient in 1939.

References

1938 American novels
Children's historical novels
American children's novels
Newbery Honor-winning works
Novels set in Cincinnati
Fiction set in 1817
Novels set in the 1820s
1938 children's books